Prem Kumar Shankardat Sharma was leader of Bharatiya Janata Party in Mumbai Maharashtra. In 1985 he was elected as a member of Maharashtra Legislative Assembly from Khetwadi (Vidhan Sabha constituency). He was re-elected for second time in 1990. He was shot dead in June 1993. He had contested 1991 Lok Sabha election against Murli Deora.

See also
 List of assassinated Indian politicians

References

External links
Telegraph India
Express India

Year of birth missing
1993 deaths
1993 murders in India
Deaths by firearm in India
Politicians from Mumbai
Assassinated Indian politicians
People murdered in Mumbai
Maharashtra MLAs 1985–1990
Maharashtra MLAs 1990–1995
Marathi politicians
Bharatiya Janata Party politicians from Maharashtra